Christopher Paul Greener (21 November 1943 – 11 February 2015) was a British actor and basketball player who went on to represent the United Kingdom.

Greener was born in New Brighton, Wallasey, Cheshire. His weight ranged from  during his adulthood. Greener from a very young age had a tumour at the base of his pituitary gland, which controls the release of human growth hormone. As a result of the tumour, Greener's pituitary gland released more growth hormone than in an average person, and he would have continued to grow had the tumour not been treated with radiation therapy when he was in his late 20s. He was born with a  length and average weight and he followed the development standards of his age during his first year of life. He grew  within three years, reaching  by the age of four. After this initial growth spurt, he continued to grow with a steady and continuous rate. He received treatment upon diagnosis, but because radiation therapy requires time to take effect, he grew another inch in the following year(s), reaching . He held the record for 40 years from 1967 to 2007, when Neil Fingleton officially took over the title from him.

In the late 1960s and early 1970s, Greener was an international basketball player for the Great Britain team, and was often at the Crystal Palace National Sports Centre.

Greener worked as an actor, often serving in various comedy roles focused on his great height. He played the circus giant in David Lynch's The Elephant Man. He appeared in several documentaries chronicling the lives of the very tall, including the World's Tallest People television special on The Learning Channel in the United States and Superhuman: Giants on the UK's ITV.

On 14 February 2011 he appeared on an episode of The Gadget Show on Five in the UK to test out phones by dropping them. He died, aged 71, in Hayes, Bromley.

Filmography

References

External links

1943 births
2015 deaths
People with gigantism
English men's basketball players